The Colour of Ink is a Canadian documentary film, directed by Brian D. Johnson and released in 2022. The film centres on Jason S. Logan, an artist and graphic designer who travels extensively to make homemade inks with natural and wild ingredients.

The film premiered at the 2022 Toronto International Film Festival on September 15, 2022.

Nicholas de Pencier received a Canadian Screen Award nomination for Best Cinematography in a Documentary at the 11th Canadian Screen Awards in 2023.

References

External links

2022 films
2022 documentary films
Canadian documentary films
2020s Canadian films